The F Word (released in some countries as What If?) is a 2013 romantic comedy film directed by Michael Dowse from a screenplay written by Elan Mastai, based on the play Toothpaste and Cigars by TJ Dawe and Michael Rinaldi. It stars Daniel Radcliffe and Zoe Kazan as two young individuals who meet and, because she has a boyfriend, decide to be "friends". Adam Driver, Megan Park, Mackenzie Davis, and Rafe Spall appear in supporting roles.

It premiered at the 2013 Toronto International Film Festival on 7 September 2013, and was released in Canada on 22 August 2014. It was nominated for Best Picture at the 2nd Canadian Screen Awards, and won for Best Adapted Screenplay.

Plot

Wallace is a young Englishman working a dead-end job and living with his sister and nephew in Toronto. He dropped out of medical school over a year ago after catching his then-girlfriend kissing their teacher, and has since not been social. He is convinced to attend his best friend Allan's party, where he meets Allan's cousin Chantry. That same night, Allan meets Nicole and they become enamored with one another.

Wallace and Chantry leave the party and he walks her home, where he learns that she has been in a long-term courtship. Nevertheless, she gives him her phone number, but he decides against calling her. They later run into each other at a movie theater and wind up having dinner together. The two form an instant connection, discussing various topics such as the Fool's Gold sandwich. They decide to become friends and Wallace is soon invited to meet Chantry's boyfriend, Ben, an attorney working for the United Nations. Ben ends up in the hospital after Wallace accidentally knocks him out of a window. At the hospital, Wallace and Chantry encounter Megan, his ex-girlfriend. Ben later moves to Dublin for six months for work, and Chantry continues her work as an animator. While Ben is gone, Wallace and Chantry's relationship continues to develop. Wallace struggles with his desire to tell Chantry how he feels, much to Allan's dismay.

Allan and Nicole get married. After the reception, Chantry's younger sister Dalia attempts to seduce Wallace in her car, but he does not reciprocate. Later on, Wallace and Chantry join Allan and Nicole for a bonfire on the beach and they decide to go skinny dipping. Allan and Nicole steal their clothes, forcing them to sleep naked together in a single sleeping bag. Feeling forced into an uncomfortable intimate situation, they express anger with their friends.

Feeling guilty, Chantry travels to Dublin to see Ben. She discovers that Ben has accepted more work commitments that require him to travel frequently and she decides to end the relationship. Meanwhile, Wallace decides to go to Dublin to express his true feelings. He encounters Ben who punches him in the face. He learns that Chantry has returned to Toronto and wants to meet. At a diner, Wallace tells Chantry about the trip and his feelings for her and she responds unfavorably, informing that she has accepted a work promotion and will be moving to Taiwan.

Heartbroken, Wallace considers going back to medical school and moving on with his life; however, he decides to attend Chantry's farewell party and they have a tearful goodbye. They finally admit to their mutual feelings after gifting each other Fool's Gold, and they kiss.

Eighteen months later, Wallace and Chantry return home from Taiwan after becoming engaged. They marry and contemplate the rest of their lives while sitting on Wallace's rooftop.

Cast

Production
Elan Mastai's script was included in the Black List's 2008 survey. Principal photography began mid-August 2012, in Toronto. A six-week shoot took place in Ontario, and ended with three days in Dublin, Ireland. The scene where Wallace runs into Chantry at a movie theater was filmed at the Royal Cinema. Most of the Toronto filming was within the East Chinatown, Leslieville and Riverdale districts, though other downtown regions were used in Toronto and Scarborough. The scene where Wallace and Chantry skinny dip was filmed at the Scarborough Bluffs.

Additional filming for a new ending took place in Toronto in November 2013. After testing the film with different focus groups, the filmmakers realized audiences wanted a more conclusive ending, and new scenes set 18 months later were shot. Radcliffe initially had reservations about changing the ending, but then felt "really happy with it". Producer Michael Dowse felt it was important to film in Toronto since the city hadn't been featured in many classic romantic comedies.

Casey Affleck was originally attached to play the lead, but was replaced by Radcliffe. Radcliffe said it was important for him to have a role in the film as he had never starred in a contemporary movie and it was something he wanted to try. In an interview with Cineplex, he said that he and co-star Zoe Kazan improvised many of their lines to create a natural atmosphere between them.

Release
The film's worldwide distribution rights were acquired by Entertainment One and they handled the theatrical release in Canada and the United Kingdom. North American sales of distribution were obtained by the UTA.

Name change
CBS Films bought the US distribution rights following the film's premiere at the 2013 Toronto International Film Festival. They changed its US release title to What If when the Motion Picture Association of America (MPAA) took issue with the implied foul word (fuck) in The F Word. The MPAA also strove for a PG-13 rating, according to producer David Gross, causing the name change in the United States. It was also retitled by Entertainment One for the UK, but the original title was retained for the Canadian release.

Home media
The film was released on DVD and streaming services on 25 November 2014.

Music

The F Word's soundtrack was scored by A. C. Newman and features artists such as Edward Sharpe and the Magnetic Zeroes, Patrick Watson, Marsha Hunt, and the Parting Gifts. The album itself has 17 tracks, 13 of which were written by A. C. Newman.
 Track listing

Reception

Critical response
The F Word was considered "one of the hottest films" at the TIFF, who named one of Canada's Top 10 films of the year.

On Rotten Tomatoes the film has an approval rating of 74% based on 134 reviews, with an average rating of 6.30/10. The site's critical consensus states: "Its narrative framework may be familiar, but What If transcends its derivative elements with sharp dialogue and the effervescent chemistry of stars Daniel Radcliffe and Zoe Kazan." On Metacritic, the film has a score of 59 out of 100, based on reviews from 36 critics, indicating "mixed or average reviews". Audiences surveyed by CinemaScore gave the film an average grade of "A–" on an A+ to F scale.

John DeFore of The Hollywood Reporter gave a positive review of the film, remarking, "Hitting all the rom-com notes with wit and some charm, it'll be a crowd-pleaser in theaters and help moviegoers move on from seeing co-star Daniel Radcliffe only as the world's favorite wizard". Justin Chang of Variety wrote, "Roughly three parts charming to one part cloying, The F Word attempts and largely succeeds at pulling off a smart, self-aware riff on romantic-comedy conventions while maintaining a core of earnest feeling". Film.com gave it a 7.2 out of 10, noting that it was "elevated from an above-average romantic comedy to a movie worthy of being embraced by a generation of twenty somethings because it refuses to let its characters off the hook". JoBlo.com's Chris Bumbray said that the film "feels like it could be the Toronto answer to the Sundance breakout hit 500 Days of Summer. Like that movie, it takes a stale genre, and gives it a hip indie twist. It is director Michael Dowse's follow-up to GOON, and just like that film, its hilariously foul script disguises a surprisingly soft, big-hearted centre". Betsy Sharkey of the Los Angeles Times thought it was "the best, and sweetest, of the filmmaker's work yet".

The Guardian initially scored the film two out of five stars, saying it was "really hard to finish" and "liable to leave you queasy" but a later review by a different reviewer scored the film four out of five stars describing it as a "light, delightful movie". Katherine Monk of Postmedia News reported that "It's a competent genre piece, but it's still a bland burger of a movie." and adding it is a movie that audiences have "...seen a hundred times before.". Eric Kohn of IndieWire wrote, "The movie primarily frustrates by doing nothing fresh. Careening toward an overly neat and tender resolution, "The F Word" lacks the gall to let its uncoordinated characters wind up victims of their situation". Peter Travers of Rolling Stone remarked that "What If doesn't break new ground. But it has charm to spare, and Radcliffe and Kazan are irresistible. No ifs about it", giving it an overall positive review.

The film has been criticized for having an entirely caucasian cast, despite being set in Toronto, with people of colour making up nearly half of Toronto's population. Alexandra Heeney of The Seventh Row writes "there's something very wrong with the fact that the entire cast is white". Criticism has also been leveled at the film for its repetitive attempts at humor through ableism. Kathryn Bromwich, writing in The Guardian, said: 'I recently had to switch off a seemingly inoffensive mid-2010s romcom (which has been described as a "light, delightful movie" with a "hip indie twist") after its fourth joke at the expense of disabled people in under an hour.'

Accolades

References

External links
 

2013 films
2013 romantic comedy films
Canadian romantic comedy films
English-language Canadian films
English-language Irish films
2010s English-language films
Films directed by Michael Dowse
Films based on Canadian plays
Films set in Dublin (city)
Films set in Toronto
Films shot in the Republic of Ireland
Films shot in Toronto
Irish romantic comedy films
2010s Canadian films